General Luís Evangelista Esteves de Araújo (born 25 February 1949 in Porto) is a former Chief of Staff of the Portuguese Air Force who served as Chief of the General Staff of the Armed Forces from 2011 to 6 February 2014.

He was decorated with the Grand Cross of the Military Order of Christ in 2014.

External links
Portuguese Armed Forces - Biography of the Chief of Staff

References

Portuguese Air Force
Air force generals
Portuguese generals
1949 births
Living people
People from Porto
Grand Crosses of the Order of Christ (Portugal)
Recipients of the Cruz de Guerra
20th-century Portuguese military personnel
21st-century Portuguese military personnel